Hippotion boerhaviae, the pale striated hawkmoth, is a moth of the family Sphingidae.

Distribution 
It is known from Sri Lanka, India, Nepal, Thailand, south-eastern China (Hong Kong and Guangdong), Vietnam, Indonesia, the Philippines, eastern Australia and New Caledonia.

Description 
The wingspan is 50–68 mm.

Biology 
Adults sometimes visit flowers. They may travel long distances, either voluntary or involuntary.

The larvae mainly feed on Oldenlandia and Spermacoce species. In India, they have been recorded on Impatiens species, Spermacoce stricta, Spermacoce hispida, Glossostigma spathulatum, Boerhavia repens and Boerhavia diffusa. The host plant is Pentas lanceolata in Australia. The larvae are green with black and white spots along each side.

The pupa is silvery brown, with a row of black spots along each side.

References

Hippotion
Moths described in 1775
Moths of Japan
Taxa named by Johan Christian Fabricius